The Ice Chateau was a multi-purpose ice arena and recreational facility located in Springfield, Illinois.  

It was the home of the Springfield Kings of the Continental Hockey League (CnHL). The Ice Chateau was also home to several Lincoln Land High School Hockey League (LLHH) and youth ice hockey teams. The facility also hosted concerts and other events. The facility closed in 1984 and was converted to an indoor soccer facility.

References

Indoor arenas in Illinois
Indoor ice hockey venues in Illinois
Sports venues in Springfield, Illinois
Sports venues completed in 1972
1972 establishments in Illinois
1984 disestablishments in Illinois